The Sigmund Freud Archives mainly consist of a trove of documents housed at the US Library of Congress and in the former residence of Sigmund Freud during the last year of his life, at 20 Maresfield Gardens in northwest London.  They were at the center of a complicated scandal, described in Janet Malcolm's book In the Freud Archives. Jeffrey Masson writes about it in Chapter Nine: "Disillusions" of his book Final Analysis.

History
After World War II Dr. Kurt R. Eissler (1909–1999) and a small group of psychoanalysts who knew Sigmund Freud personally, including Heinz Hartmann, Ernst Kris, Bertram Lewin and Hermann Nunberg, decided to preserve Freud's letters and papers in a single archive. The Library of Congress, Dr. Eissler wrote, agreed in a legal "instrument" to accept as a donation all documents collected by the Archives, and to make them accessible to scholars. By the 1980s Dr. Eissler, with the help of Anna Freud, had collected thousands of tapes, letters and papers for that archive. (An exhibition of parts of the collection was held at the Library of Congress last year and will be at the Jewish Museum this year.)

The Archives were founded in 1951 by Dr. Eissler and directed by him for decades. Dr. Eissler prevented many well-meaning scholars from seeing many Freud documents claiming confidentiality, even when their donors had not requested nor demanded that confidentiality, nor was anyone a potential victim of the revelation of those documents. In 1974 the 65-year-old Dr. Eissler met Dr. Jeffrey Moussaieff Masson (born 1941), a 33-year-old Sanskrit scholar and psychoanalyst, at a meeting of the American Psychoanalytic Association. Eissler took a liking to Masson, appointed him his secretary, and meant to make him his successor at the Archives. Being an officer of the Sigmund Freud Archives Masson had 'administrative access' to all documents in the Archives, he was allowed to see anything he wanted breaking the seal whenever necessary. In 1981 Dr. Masson, who was then the Projects Director of the Archives, delivered a paper to the Western New England Psychoanalytic Society in New Haven, Connecticut. Dr. Masson said that Freud had abandoned his seduction theory—the idea that adult neurosis is caused by childhood sexual abuse—for personal rather than scientific reasons. By dropping the seduction theory, Dr. Masson concluded, "Freud began a trend away from the real world that, it seems to me, has come to a dead halt in the present-day sterility of psychoanalysis throughout the world." Dr. Eissler was deeply shocked ("Just today Masud Khan called me from London and asked me to dismiss you from the Archives. The board members, all of them, or at least most of them, are asking for the same.") and sought to dismiss Dr. Masson from his job at the Archives, which led to bilateral legal action and a well-publicized scandal.

Masson was subsequently dismissed from his position as projects director of the Freud Archives after "a vote by the 13-member board of the Freud Archives—a nonprofit foundation controlling the vast public and private papers of Freud—not to renew Dr. Masson's contract as projects director for a second year starting in January [1982]".

The Executive Director of the Archives is Louis Rose, Ph.D. Dr. Harold P. Blum is the Executive Director, Emeritus. Blum succeeded Masson and Eissler as Executive Director of The Sigmund Freud Archives. The other current officers of the Sigmund Freud Archives are Jennifer Stuart, Ph.D. – President; Nellie L. Thompson, Ph.D. – Secretary; and W. Craig Tomlinson, Ph.D. – Treasurer.

Literature
Janet Malcolm: In the Freud Archives, New York, Knopf, 1984, . Paperback edition, New York, Vintage Books, 1985, . British edition, London, Papermac, 1997, . New edition, with an afterword by the author, New York, New York Review Books, 2002, .
 Jeffrey Moussaieff Masson: The Assault on Truth: Freud’s Suppression of the Seduction Theory. New York, Farrar, Straus and Giroux, 1984, .
Sarah Boxer: Kurt Eissler, 90, Director Of Sigmund Freud Archives. The New York Times, Obituary, February 20, 1999.
Jeffrey Moussaieff Masson: Final Analysis: The Making and Unmaking of A Psychoanalyst. Reading, Massachusetts, Addison-Wesley, 1990, . Paperback edition, New York, Ballantine Books, 2003, GTIN 9780345452788.

See also
Girindrasekhar Bose

Janet Malcolm
Jeffrey Moussaieff Masson
Peter Swales (historian)

References

External links 
 Website of the Sigmund Freud Archives, Inc.
 Freud Museum London
  Sigmund Freud and the Freud Archives The British Academy PORTAL
 The Sigmund Freud archive and the Freud exhibit at the Library of Congress
 Letter to the Library of Congress concerning the SFA dated July 31, 1995
Research
Library of Congress
Archive Catalogue of the Freud Museum London

Freud
Library of Congress
Sigmund Freud